Godar-e Kabk (also Romanized as Godār-e Kabk) is a village in Dowrahan Rural District, Gandoman District, Borujen County, Chaharmahal and Bakhtiari Province, Iran. At the 2006 census, its population was 140, in 31 families. The village is populated by Lurs.

References

See also 
Gudar people

Populated places in Borujen County
Luri settlements in Chaharmahal and Bakhtiari Province